His Life and Music is a live album by Gurrumul and The Sydney Symphony Orchestra. The album was recorded live at the Sydney Opera House for Vivid Festival in May 2013, and released through ABC Music.

The recording features Gurrumul, in a world-first collaboration with the Sydney Symphony Orchestra, performing a collection of songs from his award winning albums. Also included on the album are introductions from Gurrumul's family that provide a rare insight into the people, the country and the stories behind some of his most popular songs.

The album was released on 6 December 2013  and peaked at #48 on the ARIA album's chart.

At the AIR Awards of 2014, the album won Best Independent Classical Album.

Reviews
Tyler McLoughlan from The Music gave the album 4 1/2 stars out of 5, saying; "Gurrumul has a habit of evoking an array of overwhelming emotions in a live setting that don't even exist in the toolbox of most performers" and "[it] is a thrilling piece of the live Gurrumul experience to take home".

Track listing

Awards
Australian Independent Record Labels Association Awards 

|-
|2014
| "His Life and Music"
| Best Independent Classical Album
| 
|-
|}

Australian Recording Industry Association Awards 

|-
| rowspan=2|2014
| rowspan=2| "His Life and Music"
| Best Male Artist
| 
|-
| Best Original Soundtrack/Cast/Show Album
| 
|-
|}

Charts

Weekly charts

References

2013 live albums
Albums recorded at the Sydney Opera House
ARIA Award-winning albums
Geoffrey Gurrumul Yunupingu albums